Nissan Motor India Pvt Ltd is the Indian subsidiary of Nissan Motor Company of Japan.

History
Nissan Motor India Pvt Ltd (NMIPL) is a wholly owned subsidiary of Nissan Motor Co. Ltd Japan. The company was incorporated in 2005 and offers hatchback, MUV, SUV and sedans in India. Nissan in India has a portfolio of two brands, Nissan and Datsun. In February 2008, Nissan, together with its global alliance partner Renault signed a MoU with Government of Tamil Nadu to set up a manufacturing plant at Oragadam, near Chennai with an investment of INR 45 billion over a period of 7 years. On 17 March 2010, the Renault-Nissan alliance plant was inaugurated in a record time of 21 months since its ground breaking ceremony in June 2008.

Models

Current models

Discontinued models

Nissan 
Nissan X-Trail (2005–2014)
Nissan Teana (2006–2014)
Nissan Micra (2010–2020)
Nissan 370Z (2011–2013)
Nissan Sunny (2011–2020)
Nissan Evalia (2012–2017)
Nissan Terrano (2013–2020)
Nissan GT-R (2016–2022)

Datsun 
Datsun Go (2014–2022)
Datsun Go+ (2015–2022)
Datsun redi-Go (2016–2022)

Sales and service network
Nissan has assumed full responsibility for the sales, marketing and distribution of all Nissan-branded vehicles in India, with immediate effect from 14 February 2014.

Sales performance
NMIPL registered sales of 36,975 units in FY 2012.

See also
Nissan Motor Company
Automotive industry in India

References

Nissan
Car manufacturers of India
Manufacturing companies based in Chennai
Vehicle manufacturing companies established in 2005
Indian companies established in 2005
Indian subsidiaries of foreign companies
2005 establishments in Tamil Nadu